Kensington station may refer to:

Australia
Kensington railway station, Melbourne

Canada
Kensington Railway Station

United Kingdom
 Kensington (Olympia) station
 High Street Kensington tube station
 South Kensington tube station
 West Kensington tube station

United States
Kensington station (MARTA) in Decatur, Georgia
Kensington station (Maryland) in Kensington, Maryland
Kensington/115th Street station, in Chicago

See also
 South Kensington railway station, a station in Australia

Disambig-Class London Transport articles